Athous vittatus is a species of beetle in the family Elateridae and the genus Athous.

Description
The body is slightly hairy. Pronotum is generally dark brown, while elytra are usually chestnut or reddish brown with dark brown longitudinal stripes in the middle and in the outer edges. Also the legs have a light brown colour.

This species is closely related and similar to Athous haemorrhoidalis.

Biology
Larvae develop in the soil feeding on the roots of various herbaceous plants. They pupate from late May until early June. Adults are associated with a wide range of broadleaved trees, especially Beech (Fagus sylvatica), Hornbeam (Carpinus betulus), Oak (Quercus spp.), Walnut (Juglans regia) and Alder trees (Alnus glutinosa).

Distribution and habitat
This species is present in most of Europe and in the Near East.  It is widespread and common in England.

 It especially occurs in mixed and broadleaved woodlands.

References

Beetles described in 1793
Dendrometrinae